Königstein, also referred to as Königstein (Oberpfalz) to distinguish it from other places named Königstein, is a market town in the Amberg-Sulzbach district, Bavaria, Germany. It is located  NE of Nuremberg.

Points of interest

The Ossinger hill reaches  and is the second-highest hill in Upper Palatinate. There is a tower at the peak from which there are views of the surrounding Upper Palatinate and Franconian Jura countryside, as well as a hut that offers light refreshments.

Breitenstein Chapel is a two-story chapel situated on a rock out-cropping that dates from the second half of the 12th century. Common folk worshipped on the lower floor, while the nobility enjoyed the upper floor.

Golf Königstein is an 18-hole golf course.

Districts
Bischofsreuth
Breitenstein
Döttenreuth
Fichtenhof
Funkenreuth
Gaißach
Hannesreuth
Kürmreuth
Loch
Lunkenreuth
Mitteldorf
Mönlas
Namsreuth
Pruihausen
Röslas
Wildenhof
Windmühle
Ziegelhütte

The Königstein golf course is a challenging par 72 that is spread out through the Oberpfalz countryside with scenic views of the Oberpfalz Mountains on the front nine, and forest on the back nine. There is a very good practice area/practice tee for those who want to work on their game.  The course is located about 10 kilometers from the Vilseck Army Community.

Königstein is a tourist area frequented by Germans who enjoy "wandering" or long walks through the countryside. Also horseback riding, golfing, rappelling, and mountain biking on the beautiful trails in the scenic countryside. The village of Königstein has several restaurants serving a variety of German cuisine.

Twinnings

 Königstein im Taunus, Hesse, Germany
 Königstein, Saxony, Germany

References 

Amberg-Sulzbach